Nekoma is an unincorporated community in Weller Township, Henry County, Illinois, United States.

History
The town of Nekoma was laid out in July 1869.

Geography
The town is located in the far south of the county, at the intersections of Illinois Routes 17 and 82.

Demographics

References

Unincorporated communities in Illinois
Unincorporated communities in Henry County, Illinois